Tavai is a village in Wallis and Futuna. It is located in Sigave District on the northwestern coast of Futuna Island. Its population according to the 2018 census was 160 people.

References

Populated places in Wallis and Futuna